The Bruce Trail is a hiking trail in southern Ontario, Canada, from the Niagara River to the tip of Tobermory, Ontario. The trail mostly follows the edge of the Niagara Escarpment, one of the nineteen UNESCO World Biosphere Reserves in Canada. The land the trail traverses is owned by the Government of Ontario, local municipalities, local conservation authorities, private landowners, and the Bruce Trail Conservancy (BTC). The Bruce Trail is the oldest and longest marked hiking trail in Canada. Its name is linked to the Bruce Peninsula and Bruce County, through which the trail runs. The trail is named after the county, which was named after James Bruce, 8th Earl of Elgin who was Governor General of the Province of Canada from 1847 to 1854.

History
The idea for creating the Bruce Trail came about in 1959 out of a meeting between Ray Lowes and Robert Bateman, of the Federation of Ontario Naturalists. Ray Lowes' vision was of a public footpath that would span the entire Niagara Escarpment.

On September 23, 1960, the first meeting of the Bruce Trail Committee took place, consisting of four attending members—Ray Lowes, Philip Gosling, Norman Pearson, and Dr. Robert McLaren. Each member became instrumental in building the Bruce Trail.

Trail Director Philip Gosling was responsible for gaining access to the Niagara Escarpment. With a team of volunteers, he visited major towns along the proposed route to discuss their vision of the trail and to solicit help from landowners. Their efforts were successful, and by 1963 regional clubs were established along the length of the Trail. Each club was responsible for obtaining landowner approvals, organizing trail construction, and maintenance efforts within their region of the trail.

On March 13, 1963, the Bruce Trail Association incorporated in Ontario, and the first edition of the Association's newsletter, Bruce Trail News, was published that same year. Membership grew to 200. Dr. Aubrey Diem, an assistant professor of Geography at the University of Waterloo, compiled the first guidebook in 1965. The cairn at the northern terminus of the Bruce Trail in Tobermory was unveiled in 1967 to coincide with Canada's Centennial Year.

In August 2021, the Bruce Trail Conservancy purchased nearly 400 acres of land known as the Maple Cross Nature Reserve, its largest acquisition to date. The new protected area allowed the Bruce Trail to be extended an additional 1.8 kilometres in the Cape Chin area on the Saugeen (Bruce) Peninsula.

Natural features

There are many waterfalls along the Bruce trail, where streams or rivers flow over the Niagara Escarpment. Niagara Falls, by far the most famous water feature in the area, can be reached by a side trail of the Bruce Trail proper. There is also a wide range of plant and wildlife along the trail, including slow-growing centuries-old coniferous trees right on the limestone lip of the escarpment itself. The Cheltenham Badlands is a natural feature exposed by human activity, namely farming.

The Bruce Trail and the escarpment run through some of the most populated areas of Ontario, with an estimated 7 million people living within . Golf courses, housing, and quarries are all examples of the threatening impact that this many people have on the natural environment. The popularity of the trail itself, especially near urban areas, and the careless attitude of some of its users also paradoxically threaten the quality and viability of the trail.

Route

The trail begins in the Niagara Peninsula of Southern Ontario in Queenston, Ontario, on the Niagara River, not far from Niagara Falls. From there, it travels through St. Catharines where it passes through wine country near the Short Hills Bench. It continues due north through the major towns or cities of Hamilton, Burlington, Milton, Halton Hills, Walters Falls, Owen Sound, Wiarton, and finally Tobermory.

It passes through parks operated by various levels of government, including Woodend Conservation Area in Niagara-on-the-Lake, Battlefield Park in Stoney Creek, Dundas Valley Conservation Area in Dundas, the Hamilton-Brantford Rail Trail, Mount Nemo Conservation Area, Rattlesnake Point Conservation Area, Crawford Lake Conservation Area, Mono Cliffs Provincial Park, and the Bruce Peninsula National Park, which is located between Georgian Bay and Lake Huron near the northern tip of Bruce Peninsula. Its northern terminus is in Tobermory, the jumping off point for Fathom Five National Marine Park.

Approximately half of the trail runs through public land. In order to make a complete connection, the trail runs partly on private property and partly on road allowances. When going through private property, the BTC has made agreements with landowners to allow trail users to pass through. Using roads is not the best route for the trail. In these sections, the BTC is involved in acquiring land along what it calls the "optimum route."

Maintenance

The Federation of Ontario Naturalists surveyed the route in the early 1960s, and the responsibility for maintaining the trail was assumed by the nascent Bruce Trail Association; as of 2007, it is called the Bruce Trail Conservancy.

Currently headquartered at 55 Head Street in Dundas, the BTC marks and maintains the main trail as well as many side trails. Trail maintenance includes building bridges over streams and gullies, building stairs and switchbacks to climb slopes, building stiles over fences, and rerouting portions of the trail that have become worn through overuse.

The trail is subdivided into nine sections, each with a subsidiary club:

Volunteers inspect, repair, and build footbridges, retaining walls, stiles, and handholds along their section of the route. The BTC and subsidiary clubs offer badges for those hikers who complete the whole trail or any of its sections under prescribed conditions.

The main trail is marked with the BTC logo, a white lozenge with black text and drawings for the Bruce Trail and an upward pointing arrow, which does not act as a part of a navigational marker.

Long distance activities
The BTC regularly holds events called end to end hikes. These events, which are sometimes held over two to three days, challenge hikers to walk over long sections of the trail daily in order to hike the entire length of the trail within one of the Bruce Trail clubs.

The Bruce Trail has also attracted long-distance runners who attempt to run its entire length.  The first Fastest Known Time (FKT) was set in 1995. During the COVID19 pandemic, a number of runners broke the FKT from 2017. 

The Highlands Trailblazers Nordic Ski Team completed a relay-style run of the entire trail in 8 days, starting in Tobermory on June 24, 2008, and finishing in Queenston on July 1, 2008. This run was both a training event as well as a fundraiser for the team. In 2009, two 10-person teams running continuously in an event called the Blaze Race set a new end-to-end relay record of 3 days, 23 hours, and 10 minutes.

In 2012, adventure seekers Fred Losani, Peter Turkstra, Mark Maclennan, and Teemu Lakkasuo went on a quest to raise funds and awareness for inner-city food and nutrition programs in Hamilton, as well as the Bruce Trail Conservancy as they celebrate 50 years. The adventure began September 24, 2012, in Queenston, in the Niagara region, and ended approximately one month later in Tobermory. Along the way the hikers had the opportunity to walk with students, interact via live webcam and satellite phone transmissions, and educate students about the importance of proper nutrition, healthy living, and maintaining the Bruce Trail.

See also
 List of trails in Canada

References

External links

Bruce Trail Conservancy
Hikes on the Bruce Trail
Waypoint file in GPX format

Hiking trails in Ontario
Parks in Bruce County
Niagara Escarpment
Protected areas of the Regional Municipality of Peel